Erato prayensis is a species of small sea snail, a marine gastropod mollusk in the family Triviidae, the false cowries or trivias.

Distribution
It is found in Cape Verde, West Africa and Angola.

References

 Liltved W.R. (2000) Cowries and their relatives of southern Africa. A study of the southern African cypraeacean and velutinacean gastropod fauna. Seacomber Publications. 224 pp.
On the Identity of "Erato" prayensis de Rochebrune 1881 and description of new species in the Eratoidae. Conchylia 46(1-4): 25-36
 Ortea J. & Moro L. (2017). La taxonomia grafica aplicada a Erato prayensis Rochebrune, 1881 (Gastropoda: Littorinimorpha) de las islas de Cabo Verde. Avicennia. 20: 53-56.

External links
 Rochebrune, A.T. (1882). Diagnoses d'espèces nouvelles pour la faune de l'archipel du Cap-Vert. Bulletin de la Société Philomathique de Paris. (7) 6: 24-32

Eratoidae
Gastropods of Cape Verde
Gastropods described in 1881